Berengaria of Barcelona (1116 – January 15, 1149), called in Spanish Berenguela de Barcelona and also known as Berengaria of Provence, was Queen consort of Castile, León and Galicia. She was the daughter of Ramon Berenguer III, Count of Barcelona, and Douce I, Countess of Provence. 
 
On November 10/17, 1128 in Saldaña, Berengaria married Alfonso VII, King of Castile, León and Galicia. 

Their children were:
Sancho III of Castile (1134–1158)
Ramon, living 1136, died in infancy
Ferdinand II of León (1137–1188)
Constance (c. 1138–1160), married Louis VII of France
Sancha (c. 1139–1179), married Sancho VI of Navarre
García (c. 1142–1145/6)
Alfonso (c. 1144–c. 1149)

According to a description, "She was a very beautiful and extremely graceful young girl who loved chastity and truth and all God-fearing people."

She died in Palencia, and was buried at the Cathedral of Santiago de Compostela.

In fiction
A parody version of queen Berengaria and king Alfonso is presented in the tragicomedy La venganza de Don Mendo by Pedro Muñoz Seca.
In its film version, Lina Canalejas played Berengaria.

References

Sources

1116 births
1149 deaths
Hispanic empresses and queens
Castilian queen consorts
Leonese queen consorts
Galician queens consort
12th-century people from the County of Barcelona
12th-century Spanish women
House of Barcelona